Maruša Štangar (born 31 January 1998) is a Slovenian judoka. She competed at the World Judo Championships in 2018, 2019, 2021 and 2022.

She won one of the bronze medals in the girls' 52 kg event at the 2014 Summer Youth Olympics held in Nanjing, China.

In 2018, she won one of the bronze medals in the women's 48 kg event at the Mediterranean Games held in Tarragona, Spain. At the 2018 Judo World Masters held in Guangzhou, China, she won one of the bronze medals in her event. In 2020, she was eliminated in her first match in the women's 48 kg event at the European Judo Championships held in 
Prague, Czech Republic. Her opponent, Andrea Stojadinov of Serbia, went on to win the silver medal.

In 2021, she competed in the women's 48 kg event at the 2020 Summer Olympic Games in Tokyo, Japan. This was her Olympic debut. She won her first match against Kang Yu-jeong of South Korea and she was then eliminated in her next match by Paula Pareto of Argentina.

She won one of the bronze medals in the women's 48 kg event at the 2022 Mediterranean Games held in Oran, Algeria.

References

External links
 

Living people
1998 births
Place of birth missing (living people)
Slovenian female judoka
Judoka at the 2014 Summer Youth Olympics
Competitors at the 2018 Mediterranean Games
Competitors at the 2022 Mediterranean Games
Mediterranean Games bronze medalists for Slovenia
Mediterranean Games medalists in judo
Judoka at the 2019 European Games
European Games medalists in judo
European Games bronze medalists for Slovenia
Judoka at the 2020 Summer Olympics
Olympic judoka of Slovenia
21st-century Slovenian women